Kseniya Ilyuchshenko (born 29 May 1979) is a retired Kazakhstani volleyball player. She competed in the women's tournament at the 2008 Summer Olympics.

References

1979 births
Living people
Kazakhstani women's volleyball players
Olympic volleyball players of Kazakhstan
Volleyball players at the 2008 Summer Olympics
Sportspeople from Almaty
Volleyball players at the 2002 Asian Games
Volleyball players at the 2006 Asian Games
Asian Games competitors for Kazakhstan
21st-century Kazakhstani women